Kamlesh Balmiki (12 March 1967 – 27 May 2019) was a member of Lok Sabha, Lower House of the Parliament of India. He was elected to 15th Lok Sabha in 2009 and he represented Bulandshahr, a parliamentary constituency in Uttar Pradesh state.

Social and Cultural Activities
He associated himself with various social organisations.

References

|-

2019 deaths
India MPs 2009–2014
1967 births
Lok Sabha members from Uttar Pradesh
People from Bulandshahr district
Samajwadi Party politicians from Uttar Pradesh